The Junín antpitta (Grallaria obscura) is a species of bird in the family Grallariidae. It is endemic to the Peruvian department, Junín. It is a member of the rufous antpitta species complex and was formally elevated from subspecies to species in 2020.

Taxonomy 
The Junín antpitta was described as a subspecies in 1896, but a 2020 study found that differences in genetics, vocalizations and plumage warranted its elevation to species.

The Junín antpitta is named after Junín, Peru, the department to which the species is confined.

Distribution and habitat 
The Junín antpitta is endemic to the eastern Peruvian Andes in the department of Junín. Their range is bounded in the north by the Perené and Paucartambo rivers, in the west by the Ene river, and in the south by the Mantaro and Pampas rivers. It is found at elevations of 3,000–3,600 m. It inhabits humid montane forests and prefers the understory and forest floor.

They are separated from the closely related O'Neill's antpitta by the Perené and Paucartambo rivers and from the Urubamba antpitta by the Apurímac river.

References 

Birds of Peru
Grallaria
Endemic fauna of Peru